George Honeybone (2 April 1875 – 1 November 1956) was an Australian cricketer. He played one first-class cricket match for Victoria in 1899.

See also
 List of Victoria first-class cricketers

References

External links
 

1875 births
1956 deaths
Australian cricketers
Victoria cricketers
Cricketers from Greater London
British emigrants to colonial Australia